The Journal of Synchrotron Radiation is a peer-reviewed scientific journal published by Wiley-Blackwell on behalf of the International Union of Crystallography. It was established in 1994 and covers research on synchrotron radiation and X-ray free-electron lasers and their applications. In January 2022, Journal of Synchrotron Radiation became a fully open access journal.

Abstracting and indexing 
The journal is abstracted and indexed in:

According to the Journal Citation Reports, the journal has a 2021 impact factor of 2.557, ranking it 30th out of 64 journals in the category "Instruments & Instrumentation" and 50th out of 101 journals in the category "Optics".

References

External links 
 

Wiley-Blackwell academic journals
Publications established in 1994
Physics journals
Bimonthly journals
English-language journals